Merritt Violette House, also known as Merritt "Dad" Violette House, is a historic home located at Florida, Monroe County, Missouri. It was built in 1902–1903, and is a one-story, eclectic vernacular Queen Anne style frame dwelling with attic.  It is sheathed in clapboard and fishscale shingles and has a complex hipped and gable roof. The house has a cross-in-square plan.  It was the home of Merritt Violette, who saved Mark Twain's birthplace for the nation and instigated the Mark Twain State Park, and who built two camps for the Camp Fire Girls.

It was listed on the National Register of Historic Places in 1983.

References

Houses on the National Register of Historic Places in Missouri
Queen Anne architecture in Missouri
Houses completed in 1902
Buildings and structures in Monroe County, Missouri
National Register of Historic Places in Monroe County, Missouri